Gänsemarkt is a metro station on the Hamburg U-Bahn line U2. The underground station is located at Gänsemarkt square in the Neustadt of Hamburg, Germany. The station is also known as Gänsemarkt (Oper), named by the nearby Hamburg Opera (Oper) on Dammtorstraße.

Service

Trains 
Gänsemarkt U-Bahn station is served by Hamburg U-Bahn line U2; departures are every 5 minutes.

Gallery

See also 

 List of Hamburg U-Bahn stations

References

External links 

 Line and route network plans at hvv.de 

Hamburg U-Bahn stations in Hamburg
U2 (Hamburg U-Bahn) stations
Buildings and structures in Hamburg-Mitte
Hamburg Gansemarkt
Hamburg Gansemarkt